Ingrid Lukas (born 20 August 1984 in Tallinn, Estonia) is an Estonian singer-songwriter, pianist and composer, residing in Switzerland. She featured as part of the Swiss Government's official House of Switzerland entertainment series for athletes and the public at the 2012 Summer Olympics in London.

Biography
Ingrid Lukas spent her childhood in Estonia. According to friend and sometime collaborator Bugge Wesseltoft, she "began her music career" as a five-year-old, participating in the Baltic Way demonstrations in 1989.

She studied piano three years at the Tallinn Music High School, before moving to Switzerland in 1994. Since then she has been living in Zürich.<ref>[http://estonianworld.com/people/ingrid-lukas-the-forest-the-sea-the-roots-and-me-video Ingrid Lukas — "The forest, the sea, the roots and me"] by Stuart Garlick (Estonian World, 14 May 2013)</ref> In 2007 she graduated from the HMT Zürich (Hochschule für Musik und Theater) as a vocal teacher of pop-jazz music.

Many of her songs include lyrics in her native Estonian.

In May 2013 she was selected by the Estonian Ministry of Foreign Affairs and the Estonian Embassy to participate in the European Month of Culture in Washington, D.C.. Lukas performed at the American University with Michel Gsell.

Discography
AlbumsWe Need to Repeat – (Ronin Rhythm Records, 2009)Silver Secrets (Universal Music, 2011)Demimonde (Ronin Rhythm Records, 2015)

SinglesSolitude – Metamorphosis feat. Ingrid Lukas (Double Moon Records & Jazzthing, 2009)No Lie'' – DJ Tatana feat. Ingrid Lukas (2012)

Awards
2015/2016 "Werkjahr" (career award) from the city of Zürich
2012 2nd Prize of Estonian Music Awards

References

External links

1984 births
Living people
21st-century Estonian women singers
Estonian pianists
Estonian composers
Musicians from Tallinn
Singers from Tallinn
Tallinn Music High School alumni
Zurich University of the Arts alumni
21st-century pianists
21st-century women pianists
Estonian expatriates in Switzerland